The Regional Transport Office or District Transport Office or Regional Transport Authority   (RTO/DTO/RTA) is the organisation of the Indian government responsible for maintaining a database of drivers and a database of vehicles for various states of India. The RTO issues driving licences, organises collection of vehicle excise duty (also known as road tax and road fund licence) and sells personalised registrations.

Along with this, the RTO is also responsible to inspect vehicle's insurance and clear the pollution test.

Function of RTO:

 To enforce the provisions of the various acts of motor vehicles, central motor vehicle rules and the State motor vehicle rules as laid down by the government from time to time.
 To ensure that co-ordinated development of road transport through management of permit.
 To charge and collect tax as per the provisions of the motor vehicle act.
 To enforce road safety and bring in new amendments into force with relation to the Indian Motor Vehicle Act 1988.

The officer ranks are categorized as: (Rank from lower to higher, Mostly known by different names for designations across different states)
 Junior Inspector of Motor Vehicles
 Senior Inspector of Motor Vehicles
 Assistant Regional Transport Officer
 Regional Transport Officer 
 Followed by other top level officers acting as Administrators for the Department
The Above mentioned designation names are as per Government of Karnataka Nomenclature

RTO database
The RTO identifies untaxed vehicles (Periodic or Lifetime), and identify keepers of cars entering various Indian states, or who exceed speed limits on a road that has speed cameras by matching the cars to their keepers utilising the RTO database.
 
The High Security Registration plates (HSRP) were introduced to help reduce vehicle crime and improve security. It is intended to deter criminals from disguising stolen cars with the identity of written off or scrapped vehicles.

The RTO database  will include important details such as Make, Model, VIN number, and further changes (if any) and the owner of the car is completely entitled to with any law offense or change of ownership or renewal procedures.

There are various portals where one can check their license status.

Vehicle registration certificate
The owner of a vehicle can apply and get duplicate copy of the vehicle registration certificate from the concerned RTO office if it is stolen, lost, destructed and completely written off. A complaint should be lodged to the police station which is situated under the jurisdiction / area of lost before approaching the regional transport officer. After completing the formalities, the owner has to submit FORM 26 and the Police Certificate to the Registering Authority along with the required documents for  applying duplicate vehicle registration certificate.

Certain states in the country allow for acquiring a certificate for candidates appearing to Heavy Motor Vehicle licenses to which Government of India or Government of India allied centers take responsibility in teaching Road safety, Public driving skills and risk aversion management.

Vehicle certification pertaining to scrappage of a motor vehicle after the expiry of Green Tax validity and after the completion of Life Time Tax (Petrol vehicles up to 20 years and Diesel vehicles up to 15 years) is also carried with the Regional Transport Office of the respective states.

Certain states in the country also ensures the Regional Transport Office/Officer to inspect and issue a certification for protocol management of VIP convoys for to ensure safety and to avoid mismanagement.

See also 
 Driving licence in India
 List of RTO districts in India
 Vehicle registration plates of India

References 

Road authorities
Road transport in India
Government agencies of India
Transport organisations based in India